Charitodoron is a genus of sea snails, marine gastropod mollusks in the family Charitodoronidae.

Species
Species within the genus Charitodoron include:

 Charitodoron agulhasensis (Thiele, 1925)
 Charitodoron alcyone Lussi, 2009
 Charitodoron barbara (Thiele, 1925)
 Charitodoron bathybius (Barnard, 1959)
 Charitodoron rosadoi Kilburn, 1995
 † Charitodoron tauzini Lozouet, 1991 
 Charitodoron thalia Tomlin, 1932
 Charitodoron veneris (Barnard, 1964)
Species brought into synonymy
 Charitodoron aglaia Tomlin, 1932: synonym of Charitodoron agulhasensis (Thiele, 1925)
 Charitodoron euphrosyne Tomlin, 1932: synonym of Charitodoron barbara (Thiele, 1925)
 Charitodoron pasithea Tomlin, 1943: synonym of Charitodoron thalia Tomlin, 1932

References

 Lozouet P. (1991) Mollusca Gastropoda : Eumitra récentes de la région néo-calédonienne et Charitodoron fossiles de l'Oligocène supérieur d'Aquitaine (Mitridae). In: A Crosnier & P. Bouchet (eds), Résultats des Campagnes Musorstom 7. Mémoires du Muséum National d'Histoire Naturelle, ser. A, 150: 205-222

External links
 Tomlin J.R. le B. (1932) Reports on the marine Mollusca in the collection of the South African Museum. 6-8. Families Fasciolariidae, Fissurellidae, Buccinidae. Annals of the South African Museum 30: 157-169
 Fedosov A., Puillandre N., Herrmann M., Kantor Yu., Oliverio M., Dgebuadze P., Modica M.V. & Bouchet P. (2018). The collapse of Mitra: molecular systematics and morphology of the Mitridae (Gastropoda: Neogastropoda). Zoological Journal of the Linnean Society. 183(2): 253-337

Charitodoronidae
Gastropod genera